The 2013 Oceania Weightlifting Championships took place at the Sleeman Centre in Brisbane, Australia from 11 to 14 July 2013.

Medal summary
Results shown below are for the senior competition only. Junior and youth results are cited here and here respectively.

Medal table

Men

Women

References

Oceania Weightlifting Championships
Oceania Weightlifting Championships
International weightlifting competitions hosted by Australia
Sports competitions in Brisbane
Oceania Weightlifting Championships